Finite topology is a mathematical concept which has several different meanings.

Finite topological space 

A finite topological space is a topological space, the underlying set of which is finite.

In endomorphism rings 

If A and B are abelian groups then the finite topology on the group of homomorphisms Hom(A, B) can be defined using the following base of open neighbourhoods of zero.

This concept finds applications especially in the study of endomorphism rings where we have A = B. See section 14 of Krylov et al.

References 

General topology